Sex technology, also called sex-tech or sextech, is technology and technology-driven ventures that are designed to enhance, innovate, or otherwise change human sexuality and/or the human sexual experience. Use of the term was propagated online by Cindy Gallop from MLNP and is associated with an advancement of the Digital Revolution from 2010 and its impact on society and culture. It is often used in conjunction or interchangeably with the term 'teledildonics' referring to the remote connection between Bluetooth enabled sex toys that use haptic feedback to reciprocate or mimic human, sexual interaction. However, teledildonics is far more representative of Bluetooth-enabled sex toys and captures the technological capacities of its time whereas sex-technology is rooted in more modern discourse. As such, the word sex-tech is an umbrella term used to describe multiple technologies spanning from VR porn, health and sexual wellness platform or app-based technology, Bluetooth enabled sex toys, pornography video scripting, remote sex interfaces and sex robots.

While still nascent, sextech has seen a recent boom in mainstream acceptance due to a big push from female-led firms in the space. Notable individuals include Cindy Gallop (Founder and CEO of MLNP), Polly Rodriguez (Co-founder and CEO of Unbound), Alex Fine and Janet Lieberman (Co-founders of Dame Products), Andrea Barrica (Founder and CEO of O.School), Liz Klinger from (Co-founder and CEO of Lioness), Kate Moyle (Psychosexual & Relationship Therapist at Pillow Play), Stephanie Alys (Co-founder and CPO at MysteryVibe), Dr. Kate Devlin from Goldsmiths University, Maxine Lynn (sextech attorney, and CEO of Stript Erotic Designs), and journalists including Alix Fox, Nichi Hodgson, Rebecca Newman, Gigi Engle, Bryony Cole, Suzannah Weiss, Joseph Seon Kim, Hallie Lieberman, and GirlOnTheNet.

Sextech entrepreneur Andrea Barrica estimated the market at $30 billion in 2018, with $800 million coming from Amazon sales. Sextech has a long history, and social norms towards it are changing, contributing to the explosive growth.

Impact 

 Pornography
 Pleasure
 New kinds of sex
 New Ways To Meet Partners
 New Kinds Of Partners
 New Ways To Coordinate Hook Ups

Advantages

 Possibility of sexual enlightenment
 Stronger relationships
 Female-friendly
 Cure for loneliness
 Better sex

Criticism

 Risk of addiction
 Cyber-risk
 Unnecessary or unlawful collection and use of sensitive personal data
 Potential for harm and inequality caused by sex robots

See also
 Artificial intelligence
 Augmented reality
 Cybersex
 Haptic technology
 Teledildonics
 Virtual reality sex

References

Further reading
 This publication aims to highlight what the field of neuroscience can tell us about the implications of using interactive technologies on young people’s brains, behaviours and attitudes.
  Closer Together, Further Apart offers both current and unique insight into the cultural shifts brought about by digital technology and the Internet
 Future of Sex - The world's leading publication on the intersection of technology and sexuality.

External links
 Future of Sex
 Technophilia - "Sex hasn’t changed much, but our various points of access to it have changed dramatically along with new technologies"
 The future of sex
 How SexTech impacts our lives
 Technology for better sex
 How SexTech could threaten the world's oldest profession
 How technology makes sex life better
 Sex in the digital age
 How the internet has changed sex

Sexuality and computing
Sex industry
Internet culture